The Rouanet Law is a Brazilian law named after Sérgio Paulo Rouanet whose role is providing monetary funds for use in art and culture, including the production of movies. It is intended to encourage cultural investments and its major highlight is the tax incentive policy that enables companies and citizens to deduct a portion of income tax.

All projects must be approved by the Brazilian Ministry of Culture that examines technical feasibility of activities.

Controversies 

Despite the pros, there is criticism against the law, which includes the possibility of funds being misappropriated. Critics also argue that the Ministry, rather than directly investing in culture, began to let companies themselves decide which kind of culture deserved to be sponsored.

In 2018, an attempt to revoke the Rouanet Law ruled the Federal Senate. The 2017 Legislative Suggestion Nº 49 requested the revocation of the law, but was rejected by the Human Rights Commission and Participatory Legislation of the Senate, following the report of Senator Marta Suplicy.

References

External links 
 Official website
 Brazil's Federal Law 8313 of 23 December 1991
 Ministry of Culture
 Corruption Allegations

Brazilian legislation
Income taxes
Tax legislation